The  is a legendary Japanese sword and one of three Imperial Regalia of Japan.

Kusanagi, which means "grass cutter", may also refer to:

People
Tsuyoshi Kusanagi (草彅 剛, born 1974) Japanese entertainer, member of the Japanese idol group SMAP

In fiction
Motoko Kusanagi, fictional Japanese character in the Ghost in the Shell anime and manga series
Suito Kusanagi, a fictional character in the Sky Crawlers book series
Kyo Kusanagi, one of the main characters in SNK Corporation's The King of Fighters video game series
Kei Kusanagi and Mizuho Kusanagi, characters in the anime series Please Teacher!
Godou Kusanagi, one of the characters in the Campione! light novel and anime series
Kusanagi, a fictional weapon in the Naruto franchise
Kusanagi Shiyū, a member of the Dragons of Earth in the X anime and manga series
Blade of Kusanagi, a weapon in the video game Ōkami developed by Clover Studio
Kimiko Kusanagi and Kaito Kusanagi, characters in the webcomic Dresden Codak
Nene Kusanagi, a character in the video game Hatsune Miku: Colorful Stage!

Other uses
Kusanagi, a technique in Danzan-ryū jujutsu

Japanese-language surnames